The 2011 Chesapeake Bayhawks season was the 11th season for the Chesapeake Bayhawks of Major League Lacrosse. The defending Steinfeld Cup champions fell in the playoffs to the Boston Cannons in the 2011 MLL semifinals.

Off season

Draft 
The Bayhawks acquired only 5 men from the 2011 MLL Draft.

Regular season

Schedule

Postseason
The 2011 MLL playoffs were held at the Bayhawk's own Navy–Marine Corps Memorial Stadium on August 27 and 28. Despite having the home field advantage, 4-seeded Chesapeake fell to #1 Boston 14-13. It was a rematch of last year's semifinal game, which Chesapeake won 13-9.

Playoff Bracket

Semifinal: Boston

References

External links
 

Chesapeake Bayhawks seasons
Chesapeake Bayhawks